Ernest Blackham (4 July 1898 – 24 December 1966) was an English football goalkeeper who appeared once for Port Vale in May 1921.

Career
Blackham joined Port Vale in May 1921 and made his Second Division debut on 6 May 1921, in a 2–0 defeat at Bradford Park Avenue. This was to be his only appearance however, and he was released at the end of the 1922–23 season, in which rivals Teddy Peers played 43 games and Daniel Smith also played once.

Career statistics
Source:

References

1898 births
1966 deaths
Sportspeople from Newcastle-under-Lyme
English footballers
Association football goalkeepers
Port Vale F.C. players
English Football League players